Yashtikasana (Yastikasana) or Stick position is a beginner level yoga pose that is usually performed in preparation for more intermediate to advanced level asanas. In Sanskrit, "Yastik" means stick. 

It is widely used for meditation. Yastikasana ultimate simple yoga pose to destress and remove all fatigue. Distress is the opposite of eustress, a positive stress that motivates people.  

The pose, when it done correctly, can be very therapeutic for the human mind and body. Regular practice of this exercise is considered in haṭha yoga as one of the ways to prevent diseases and return to a healthy state.

Etymology 
The name Yastikasana comes from the Sanskrit words yastik (सिद्ध) meaning "stick", and asana (आसन) meaning "posture".

Steps to do the asana
To do Yastikasana, lie down flat on the floor or on the mat, or lying on the water. Take your hands above the head while lying flat on the floor and stretch them. Stretch your legs as maximum as you can. There should be minimum gap between the arms and legs. Feel the stretch in the body as Stick Pose stretches the whole body. Maintain this position for as long as possible. Come to original position or relax in Shavasana.
Practice Yastikasana for 5-6 times to reap the maximum benefits.

Benefits
It aids better circulation of body, tones the usually relaxed abdominal and pelvic floor, facilitates maximum straitening of body.
It stretches the arms and hips well, relieves joint pain, improves flexibility, stretches the spine, causes relaxation of the whole body, especially the muscles of the abdominal wall and pelvis.

The stick pose can be done every time the body gets tired. At first, the asana seems very easy, but it is quite difficult to perform it correctly, since you need to consciously relieve tension in all the muscles of the body. Yashtikasana gives the body the necessary rest. Constant violations of posture create an excessive load on the muscles of the back, which hardly get proper relaxation in the usual lying position. The stick pose, like other relaxation asanas, significantly relaxes the spine and related structures and is especially recommended for back problems. Yashtikasana can be performed at any convenient time of the day.

Stick pose steps up the body's usage of fat reserves and exercises the muscles of the neck, back and upper limbs.

The use of Yashtikasana is recommended to relieve constipation, especially after cancer chemotherapy.

Precautionary measures
Yastikasana is not recommended for patients with cardiovascular disease, high blood pressure, convex prominence of the spine (kyphosis), chronic back pain and spinal cord injury, especially such as a spinal disc herniation.

See also 
 List of asanas 
 Yoga as exercise
 Yoga as therapy

References

Sources

External links

Video 
 

Reclining asanas
Medieval Hatha Yoga asanas